Jesus College is one of the constituent colleges of the University of Oxford in England.  The college was founded in 1571 by Queen Elizabeth I at the request of Hugh Price, a Welsh clergyman, who was Treasurer of St David's Cathedral in Pembrokeshire. The college still has strong links with Wales, and about 15% of students are Welsh. There are 340 undergraduates and 190 students carrying out postgraduate studies. Women have been admitted since 1974, when the college was one of the first five men's colleges to become co-educational. Old members of Jesus College are sometimes known as "Jesubites".

Three Archbishops of Wales have studied at Jesus College.  A. G. Edwards, the first archbishop of the Church in Wales after its disestablishment, read Literae Humaniores from 1871 to 1874, and was archbishop from 1920 to 1934. Glyn Simon, a student from 1922 to 1926, was Archbishop of Wales from 1968 to 1971.  He was succeeded by Gwilym Williams, who was archbishop from 1971 to 1982. Other bishops to have held office in Wales include Francis Davies, Roy Davies, John Harris and Morgan Owen (who were all Bishops of Llandaff), Humphrey Humphreys, Daniel Lewis Lloyd and Humphrey Lloyd (who were Bishops of Bangor), William Lloyd and John Wynne (who were Bishops of St Asaph), and John Owen and William Thomas (who were Bishops of St David's). William Havard was a Welsh rugby international before becoming Bishop of St Asaph, then Bishop of St David's.

Several former students have been appointed as cathedral deans; many others became parish priests in Wales and elsewhere in the Anglican church, some also finding time for other activities such as writing poetry or pursuing antiquarian interests.  At least five have been Dean of Bangor: Henry Edwards, Henry James, Evan Lewis, John Pryce and James Vincent. Llewelyn Hughes was Dean of Ripon from 1951 to 1967, Alex Wedderspoon was Dean of Guildford from 1987 to 2001, and Wesley Carr was Dean of Westminster Abbey from 1997 to 2006. Edmund Meyrick, who studied at the college between 1656 and 1659, became Treasurer of St David's Cathedral; he left money in his will to the college to fund scholarships for Welsh students, which are still awarded. The lexicographer John Davies of Mallwyd, who translated the Bible into Welsh, studied at the college. In the mid-19th century, some Anglican priests were influenced by John Henry Newman and converted to Roman Catholicism, including David Lewis; Edmund Ffoulkes also converted, but later returned to Anglicanism, becoming vicar of the University Church of St Mary the Virgin in Oxford. John David Jenkins, who was Canon of Pietermaritzburg for a time, was later nicknamed the "Rail men's Apostle" for his ministry to railway workers in Oxford. David Thomas, a priest in Gwynedd, was instrumental in the foundation of a Welsh church in the Welsh settlement in Argentina.

Some students became ministers in other denominations of Christianity. Methodists include David Charles and Christopher Bassett; Baptists include Gwilym Davies (the first person to broadcast on the radio in Welsh, in 1923); Welsh Presbyterians include William David Davies and Gwilym Edwards; Unitarians include John Islan Jones; and Catholics include John Hugh Jones and the Benedictine monk and poet Sylvester Houédard.

Alumni

Abbreviations used in the following table
 M – Year of matriculation at Jesus College (a dash indicates that the individual did not matriculate at the college)
 G – Year of graduation / conclusion of study at Jesus College (a dash indicates that the individual moved to another college before graduating or concluding studies)
 DNG – Did not graduate: left the college without obtaining a degree
 ? – Year unknown; approximate year used for table-sorting purposes
 (F/P) – later became a fellow or principal of Jesus College, and included on the list of principals and fellows
 (HF) – later became an honorary fellow of Jesus College, and included on the list of honorary fellows

Degree abbreviations
 Undergraduate degree: BA – Bachelor of Arts
 Postgraduate degrees:
BCL – Bachelor of Civil Law
BD – Bachelor of Divinity
BLitt – Bachelor of Letters
BTh – Bachelor of Theology
MA – Master of Arts
MB – Bachelor of Medicine
MD – Doctor of Medicine
DCL – Doctor of Civil Law
DD – Doctor of Divinity
DPhil – Doctor of Philosophy

The subject studied and the degree classification are included, where known.  Until the early 19th century, undergraduates read for a Bachelor of Arts degree that included study of Latin and Greek texts, mathematics, geometry, philosophy and theology.  Individual subjects at undergraduate level were only introduced later: for example, Mathematics (1805), Natural Science (1850), Jurisprudence (1851, although it had been available before this to students who obtained special permission), Modern History (1851) and Theology (1871). Geography and Modern Languages were introduced in the 20th century. Music had been taught as a specialist subject, rather than being part of the BA course, before these changes; medicine was studied as a postgraduate subject.

Archbishops and bishops

Deans

Other cathedral clergy

Other Anglican clergy

Clergy from other denominations

References
Notes

Bibliography

 The Jesus College Record – annual publication. Cited in references as: JCR
  Cited in references as: Baker
  Cited in references as: Foster, 1500–1714
  Cited in references as: Foster, 1715–1886
  Cited in references as: Oxford Men
  Cited in references as: Members List
  Cited in references as: Honours Supplement 1930
  Cited in references as: Honours Supplement 1950
  Cited in references as: Honours Supplement 1965
   Cited in references as: ODNB
  Cited in references as: Honours
  Cited in references as: DWB
   Cited in references as: Who's Who
   Cited in references as: Who Was Who

External links
 List of notable Old Members, Jesus College website

Alumni Clergy
Lists of people associated with the University of Oxford